Salsola is a genus of the subfamily Salsoloideae in the family Amaranthaceae. The genus sensu stricto is distributed in central and southwestern Asia, North Africa, and the Mediterranean. A common name of various members of this genus and related genera is saltwort, for their salt tolerance. The genus name Salsola is from the Latin salsus, meaning "salty".

Description
The species of Salsola are mostly subshrubs, shrubs, small trees, and rarely annuals. The leaves are mostly alternate, rarely opposite, simple, and entire. The bisexual flowers have five tepals and five stamens. The pistil ends in two stigmata. The fruit is spherical with a spiral embryo and no perisperm.

Systematics
The genus name Salsola was first published in 1753 by Linnaeus in Species Plantarum. The type species is Salsola soda L.

The genus Salsola belongs to the tribe Salsoleae s.s. of the subfamily Salsoloideae in the family Amaranthaceae. The genus was recircumscribed in 2007 based on molecular phylogenetic research, greatly reducing the number of species. Synonyms of Salsola sensu stricto are: Darniella Maire & Weiller, Fadenia Aellen & Townsend, Neocaspia Tzvelev and Hypocylix Wol..

The genus Salsola s.s. comprises 24-25 species since Akhani et al., 2007: 
 Salsola acutifolia (Bunge.) Botsch. 
Salsola arbusculiformis Drob.
 Salsola cruciata Chevall. ex Batt. & Traubut
 Salsola cyrenaica (Maire & Weiller) Brullo
 Salsola drummondii Ulbr.
 Salsola foliosa (L.) Schrad.
 Salsola genistoides Poir. 
 Salsola grandis Freitag, Vural & N.Adigüzel
 Salsola glomerata (Maire) Brullo
 Salsola gymnomaschala Maire
 Salsola kerneri (Wol.) Botsch.
 Salsola laricifolia Turcz. ex Litv.
 Salsola longifolia Forssk.
 Salsola makranica Freitag
 Salsola melitensis Botsch.
 Salsola oppositifolia Desf.
 Salsola papillosa Willk.
 Salsola setifera (Moq.) Akhani (Basionym: Anabasis setifera Moq.)
 Salsola sinaica Brullo
 Salsola soda L.
 Salsola tunetana Brullo
 Salsola verticillata Schousboe
 Salsola zygophylla Batt. & Traub.
 Salsola zygophylloides (Aellen & Townsend) Akhani (Basionym: Fadenia zygophylloides Aellen & Townsend)

Excluded species: Many species formerly grouped in Salsola were excluded by Akhani et al. (2007). They are now classified in separate genera:
 Kali (for Salsola sect. Kali)
 Turania (for Salsola sect. Sogdiana)
 Xylosalsola (for Salsola sect. Coccosalsola subsect. Arbuscula)
 Caroxylon (for Salsola sect. Caroxylon)
 Caroxylon imbricatum (Forssk.) Moq. (Syn. Salsola imbricata Forssk.)
 Caroxylon vermiculatum (L.) Akhani & Roalson (Syn. Salsola vermiculata L.)
 Kaviria (for Salsola sect. Belanthera)

Uses
The leaves and shoots of S. soda, known in Italy as barba di frate or agretti, are cooked and used as vegetables. The species is also used for the production of potash. In Namibia, where the plant is called gannabos, it is a valuable fodder plant.

References

Amaranthaceae
Halophytes
Barilla plants
Drought-tolerant plants
Amaranthaceae genera